Steinway Lyngdorf is a brand name of high-end audio systems produced by Steinway & Sons and Lyngdorf Audio. In 2007 the first music system was created: "Steinway Lyngdorf Model D" with a cost of $150,000US, although, as of November 2014, this had been increased to $228,000. The Steinway Lyngdorf Model D was co-designed by design studio Jacob Jensen Design.

History
Lyngdorf Audio is a Danish audio system company founded in Denmark in 2005 by Peter Lyngdorf. It's currently managed by director Thomas Birkelund. The company produces audio systems including loudspeakers and amplifiers. In 2007, piano maker Steinway & Sons gave the company exclusive rights to manufacture audio systems under the name Steinway Lyngdorf.

Products

The goal was to be able to reproduce the sound of a Steinway grand piano so precisely that pianists could not tell whether they were listening to a real piano or a recording. Furthermore, it was hoped that the sound could be compared with the experience of a live symphony or concert. The product's exterior is inspired by the look of Steinway grand pianos and their traditional lacquered satin-black color, although it is now possible to select a custom finish.

Steinway Lyngdorf are the world's first systems with digital audio fully integrated. The systems include an advanced version of Lyngdorf's technological invention "RoomPerfect", which, the company claims, enables the systems to adapt to the acoustic characteristics of any listening environment. The systems are composed of expensive materials, including large quantities of gold, brass and aluminum; e.g. there is more aluminum in one loudspeaker than in an Audi A8. Each loudspeaker weighs 174 kg. The systems are handmade and it takes more than 170 hours to assemble each system.

One of Lyngdorf's technologies is the room acoustics measuring and correction feature, RoomPerfect. With this feature, the audio system corrects the audio so it will fit with the environment, providing optimal sound in two modes. One mode focuses on one single location in the room, resulting in better audio to the listener. The other mode does not focus on any specific location, but optimizes the sound so it will sound the same anywhere in the room.

References

External links
Steinway Lyngdorf website

Lyngdorf
Compact Disc player manufacturers
Loudspeaker manufacturers
Audio equipment manufacturers of Denmark